Peter is a 2021 Marathi language film directed by Amol Arvind Bhave. The Film is presented and distributed by Rohandeep Singh of Jumping Tomato Marketing Pvt Ltd. The film was released on 22 January 2021.

Cast
 Prem Borhade, as Dhanya
 Manisha Bhor as Paru
 Amol Pansare as Babaji 
 Vinietaa Sancheti  as leela
 Siddheshwar Siddhesh  as Sopan 
 Sunil Dhage as in Baba 
 Sharad Rajguru as Bhagat

Plot 
The story is about a 10 year old boy named Dhanya and his baby goat. As a ritual in the village , goats are sacrificed .As there were no goats available because of the fair in village ,villagers had an eye on Dhanya's goat but as the goat was too small it was not considered for scarification.The villagers decided to plan the event after 6 months. For raising the baby goat Dhanya was elected and he happily accepted the job.Being together for almost 5 month with the goat,Dhanya develops a strong friendship. Dhanya was called as Peter by his school friends.

As day by day the bond between Dhanya and baby goat increased , Dhany's mother got worried about the day of sacrifice. The event was hold for his uncle could have a baby.

References

External links
 Peter at Cinestaan
 Peter at IMDB

2020s Marathi-language films
2021 films